The House on Chelouche Street is a 1973 semi-autobiographical film by Israeli director Moshé Mizrahi, filmed in Hebrew, Egyptian Arabic and Judeo-Spanish (a.k.a. Ladino, a Jewish language mostly derived from Old Castilian). The film was nominated for the Academy Award for Best Foreign Language Film.

Plot
The film tells the story of a Sephardi family of Egyptian Jewish immigrants from Alexandria that settle in 1947 Tel Aviv. The family consists of a 33-year-old widowed wife, Clara, (played by Gila Almagor, one of the most prominent actresses in Israel for the last three decades) and her four children. They live in a working-class neighborhood surrounded by their extended family, including Clara's mother Mazal, Clara's uncle Rafael, and Sultana, his wife.

The plot centers on the firstborn, Sami, his transition from a shy 15-year-old to a working man and an activist in the "Irgun" (a resistance movement that acted mainly against the military forces of the British), and the romantic attachment he develops with a 25-year-old Russian immigrant librarian (Michal Bat-Adam, now a director). In addition to this, Clara struggles between social pressure to take a husband and her own complex feelings surrounding this, complicated by another Sephardi Egyptian, played by Yosef Shiloach, who has strong feelings for her.

The film is a vivid and very credible description of the lives of Sephardi immigrant families on the eve of the declaration of the state of Israel. Also covered are the escalating violence between British forces and the local populace, as well as Palestinian Arab violence towards Jews.

Cast
 Gila Almagor as Clara
 Ofer Shalhin as Sami
 Michal Bat-Adam as Sonia
 Yosef Shiloach as Nissim
 Rolf Brin as Grossman

See also
 List of submissions to the 46th Academy Awards for Best Foreign Language Film
 List of Israeli submissions for the Academy Award for Best Foreign Language Film

References

External links

 

1973 films
1970s Hebrew-language films
Judaeo-Spanish-language films
Films about immigration
Films about Jews and Judaism
Films directed by Moshé Mizrahi
Films set in 1947
Films set in Tel Aviv
1973 drama films
Israeli multilingual films
1973 multilingual films
Israeli drama films
Golan-Globus films
Films produced by Menahem Golan